Spieler is a German and Jewish surname, meaning "player" in German. Notable people with the surname include:

 Jeffrey Spieler (born 1945), Senior Advisor at the United States Agency for International Development
 Marlena Spieler (born 1949), food writer
 Mathias Spieler (c. 1640–1691), Swedish architect
 Simen Spieler Nilsen (born 1993), Norwegian speed skater

References

German-language surnames